Paul Ledran was a French weightlifter. He competed in the men's middleweight event at the 1920 Summer Olympics.

References

External links
 

Year of birth missing
Year of death missing
French male weightlifters
Olympic weightlifters of France
Weightlifters at the 1920 Summer Olympics
Place of birth missing